Francis Patrick Irwin (7 February 1897 – 8 November 1985) was an Australian rules footballer who played with Carlton in the Victorian Football League (VFL).

Notes

External links 
Frank Irwin's playing statistics from The VFA Project

Frank Irwin's profile at Blueseum

1897 births
1985 deaths
Brighton Football Club players
Carlton Football Club players
Australian rules footballers from Melbourne
People from West Melbourne, Victoria